Abyssal Warriors is a fantasy novel by J. Robert King, set in the world of Planescape, and based on the Dungeons & Dragons role-playing game. It is the second novel published in the "Blood Wars Trilogy". It was published in June 1996.

Plot summary
Abyssal Warriors is the second part of the Bloodwars trilogy that began with Blood Hostages. In Abyssal Warriors, Aereas and Nina, though naive in the ways of the planes, have successfully rescued Artus from his kidnappers. Now Aereas must go to save his love from the underworld. The planes have had their effect on the young girl and Aereas finds himself battling for her mind as well as her body as she becomes increasingly influenced by the forces of extreme evil that exist throughout the planes.

Reception
Jonathan Palmer reviewed Abyssal Warriors for Arcane magazine, rating it a 7 out of 10 overall. He commented that "King is better known for his Ravenloft works, but here he proves he can write weirdly enough for Planescape as well." Palmer noted that with Abyssal Warriors and Blood Hostages, "In both books the horror of Planescape is successfully evoked without getting you too bogged down in impossible-to-understand descriptions - the level of explanation is mystical rather than rational." He quipped, "Now, isn't that just typical of a girl to get caught up in a mess like that? It is in many of these books, anyway - but let's not worry about that now." Palmer concluded his review by saying, "As a novel then, this is tosh, as a sourcebook for an imaginative referee, however, it's another book chock-full of all sorts of completely horrid off-the-wall stuff from way out in the leftfield. Give it a go."

References

1996 novels
Novels based on Dungeons & Dragons
Novels by J. Robert King
Planescape